Guillermo Tomás Soto Arredondo (born 10 January 1994), is a Chilean footballer  who plays as right-back for Huracán in the Argentine Primera División.

Club career
Guillermo did all lower in Universidad Católica but his debut was in Rangers de Talca.

External links

1994 births
Living people
Chilean footballers
Chilean expatriate footballers
Association football fullbacks
Rangers de Talca footballers
A.C. Barnechea footballers
Club Deportivo Universidad Católica footballers
Club Deportivo Palestino footballers
Club Atlético Huracán footballers
Chilean Primera División players
Chilean expatriate sportspeople in Argentina
Expatriate footballers in Argentina